La Carrera is a parish in Siero, a municipality within the province and autonomous community of Asturias, in northern Spain. It is located south of Highway N-634 and north of Highway A-64. The capital, Pola de Siero, is to the northeast.

Villages and neighbourhoods 
Following the 2011 Nomenclator, the parish of La Carrera is divided in these villages and neighbourhoods:
 El Berrón (3,473 inhabitants)
 La Carrera
 Ferrera
 Forfontía
 Les Granxes
 Mudarri (Mudarre)
 Nora (Ñora)
 La Parte
 Posada (Posá)
 Vega Muñiz (Vegamuñiz)
 Venta de Soto (La Venta Soto)
 Gijún (Xixún)

References

External links
 Asturian society of economic and industrial studies, English language version of "Sociedad Asturiana de Estudios Económicos e Industriales" (SADEI)

Parishes in Siero